Pauline Rochester Kibbe (1909–2006) was an American author. She won the Anisfield-Wolf Award for her book about Latin Americans in Texas.

She was born in Pueblo, Colorado.

She served as executive secretary of the Good Neighbor Commission of Texas.

Books
 Latin Americans in Texas (1946)
 Guide to Mexican History (1966)
 Minute guide to speaking Spanish

References

1909 births
2006 deaths
People from Pueblo, Colorado
20th-century American women writers
21st-century American women writers